Parliamentary elections were held in South Ossetia on 9 June 2019.

The ruling United Ossetia party lost its majority in parliament. Only three other elected members guaranteed their support if United Ossetia was to form a government, leaving it one seat short of a majority.

Electoral system
A new electoral system was introduced prior to the elections, introducing a mixed electoral system, with 17 of the 34 seats elected by proportional representation in a single nationwide constituency, and the other 17 elected by first-past-the-post voting in single member constituencies. Between 2004 and 2014, all seats were elected by proportional representation.

Results

References

Elections in South Ossetia
South Ossetia
2019 in Georgia (country)
2019 in South Ossetia
Election and referendum articles with incomplete results